Karawang Station (KW) is a class I railway station located in Nagasari, West Karawang, Karawang Regency. The station, which is located at an altitude of +16 m, is included in the Operation Area I Jakarta and is the station that is located in the westernmost of Karawang Regency.

At this station there is an old dipo building for steam tram locomotives. To the south from the old dipo (20 meters) a new dipo was established close to the station emplacement. This new depot has two railway tracks connected to track 4. This new depot is not a locomotive depot, but a mechanical depot.

Services
The following is a list of train services at the Karawang Station

Passenger services
 Mixed class
 Economy class
 Local

References

External links
 

Karawang Regency
Railway stations in West Java
railway stations opened in 1898